PNC Bank Building may refer to:

 PNC Bank Building (Columbus, Ohio)
 PNC Bank Building (Toledo, Ohio)
 PNC Bank Building (Philadelphia)
 PNC Bank Building (Washington, D.C.)